Ulyanovo is a rural locality (a village) in Yugskoye Rural Settlement, Cherepovetsky District, Vologda Oblast, Russia. The population was 37 as of 2002.

Geography 
Ulyanovo is located 52 km east of Cherepovets (the district's administrative centre) by road. Maximovskoye is the nearest rural locality.

References 

Rural localities in Cherepovetsky District